Benjamin Fitton is an English singer songwriter. He released his first album under the pseudonym of This Unique Museum in 2006 after winning a best unsigned band competition on London's XFM Radio.

In April 2010 he began writing and recording a Song a Week for an entire year.

Discography 
Something for the Year #1 (30 August 2010)

 That Old Oak Tree
 We Don't Know What We've Got
 A Hotel Room Where The Sun Don't Set
 All I Want is You
 A Beautiful Lie and the Ugly Truth
 22:22
 State of the Great Lake
 Inside Out
 The Sweetest Girl I Ever Saw

Something for the Year #2 (31 January 2011)

 Solar System Diorama Blues
 Today Is Not The Day
 The Deepest Rabbit Hole
 Years Go By
 Sunday Comes Around
 Father Through The Son
 Coming Home
 Come Down From That Cloud
 The Good We Do

Something for the Year #3 (30 May 2011)

 We See Stars
 Echoes In My Mind
 The Cold Wind Blows
 Someday
 Puzzle Pieces
 Keep The Wolf From Your Door
 Who We Are
 The Human Heart
 Golden Leaves

Something for the Year #4 (22 August 2011)

 What Road To Take
 The Souls I Leave Behind
 The Silence I Hear
 Amongst The Pines
 Speak The Truth
 Let This Feeling Go
 A Fairy Tale On A Bookshelf
 Gardens of Babylon
 Two Of Us

References

External links
Official Website

British male singers
Living people
Year of birth missing (living people)